Neferka was an ancient Egyptian pharaoh of the Sixth Dynasty, who briefly reigned around 2200 BC.

A king with the name Neferka, written in the papyrus as Neferka-khered appears in the Turin King List between king Netjerkare Siptah and a king Nefer. Neferka and Nefer are most likely writing errors in the papyrus. Several scholars regard Neferka as mistake for "Neferkare" and identify him with Neferkare Pepiseneb. Other identify him with Menkare.

References

23rd-century BC Pharaohs
22nd-century BC Pharaohs
Pharaohs of the Sixth Dynasty of Egypt
Year of birth missing
Year of death missing